This is a list of MPs that lost their seat at the 2015 Canadian federal election. Outgoing incumbents are identified by their party affiliation at dissolution.

 Bold indicates Cabinet Minister or member of Opposition shadow cabinet
 ‡ means that Incumbent was originally from a different riding

  Sat as NDP at dissolution; joined and ran for the Green Party after writ was issued.
  Ran for the New Democratic Party.
  Ran for Strength in Democracy

Lists of Canadian MPs who were defeated by election